Breakaway is the second solo studio album by Art Garfunkel.  It was released in 1975 on Columbia Records.  It was produced by Richard Perry who has produced albums for other artists such as Carly Simon and Ringo Starr.  It includes three Top 40 singles: "I Only Have Eyes for You" (US #18, UK #1), "Break Away" (US #39) and the Simon & Garfunkel reunion duet, "My Little Town" which peaked at #9. "[I Only Have Eyes For You]" is noted also for being Garfunkel's first #1 single in the UK. Breakaway has proven to be Garfunkel's most successful solo album; although peaking at number 7 in the United States, which was lower than his first album Angel Clare (US #5), it has been certified platinum by RIAA.

Album cover
The cover consists of a Norman Seeff  photograph taken at a staged photo shoot at Dan Tana’s Restaurant at 9071 Santa Monica Boulevard in Hollywood. On the left is Helena Kallianiotes, Garfunkel in the middle, and on the right Laurie Bird. There has been speculation that the art was inspiration for Leonard Cohen's Death of a Ladies' man (album) cover, but there has never been confirmation by either artist, nor their photographers.

Release history
In addition to the usual 2-channel stereo version the album was also released by Columbia Records in 1975 in a 4-channel quadraphonic version on LP record and 8-track tape. The LP version was encoded in the SQ matrix format.

The album was reissued in the UK in 2018 by Dutton Vocalion on the Super Audio CD format. This edition contains both the stereo and quadraphonic mixes.

Track listing

Personnel
 Art Garfunkel – vocals
 Toni Tennille, David Crosby, Graham Nash, Jon Joyce – backing vocals
 Stephen Bishop – acoustic guitar, backing vocals
 Steve Cropper, Pete Carr – electric guitar
 Paul Simon – acoustic guitar, backing vocals
 Andrew Gold – acoustic guitar, ukulele, piano, electric guitar, Fender Rhodes, backing vocals
 Nicky Hopkins – piano, Fender Rhodes
 Bruce Johnston – piano, backing vocals, whistle
 Jim Keltner, Rick Shlosser, Jim Gordon, John Guerin, Russ Kunkel, Roger Hawkins, Denny Seiwell – drums
 Louis Shelton, Lon Van Eaton – acoustic guitar
 Barry Beckett, John Barlow Jarvis – piano
 Max Bennett, Lee Sklar, Joe Osborn, David Hood, Reinie Press, Klaus Voormann – bass guitar
 Joe Clayton – percussion
 David Katz – violin, orchestra contractor
 Larry Knechtel – piano, Fender Rhodes
 Ralph MacDonald - percussion
 Del Newman – conductor
 Bill Payne – piano, Fender Rhodes, synthesizer, Mellotron
 New World Philharmonic Orchestra – orchestra
 Helena Kallianiotes – cover model

Production
 Richard Perry – producer
 Art Garfunkel – co-producer
 Kathie Carey – production coordinator 
 Brooks Arthur – recording engineer 
 Bill Schnee – remix (stereo and quadraphonic)
 Doug Sax – mastering 
 John Brogna – design
 Ron Coro – design
 Norman Seeff – photography
 Larry Emerine – photography (inner sleeve)

Charts

Weekly charts

Year-end charts

Certifications

References

1975 albums
Art Garfunkel albums
Albums produced by Richard Perry
Columbia Records albums
Albums produced by Art Garfunkel
Albums produced by Paul Simon
Albums produced by Phil Ramone
Albums recorded at A&M Studios
Albums recorded at Muscle Shoals Sound Studio